The Committee on the Office of the Deputy Prime Minister is a former United Kingdom parliamentary select committee. It was abolished in 2006 and replaced with the Communities and Local Government Select Committee following the abolition of the Office of the Deputy Prime Minister, which was replaced by the Department for Communities and Local Government.

Members
List of members:

Phyllis Starkey
Paul Beresford
Clive Betts
Lyn Brown
John Cummings
Greg Hands
Martin Horwood
Anne Main
Bill Olner
John Pugh
Alison Seabeck

References

2006 disestablishments in the United Kingdom
Defunct Select Committees of the British House of Commons